Orbital Marine Power is a Scottish renewable energy company focused on the development and global deployment of its pioneering floating turbine technology. The O2 is Orbital's first commercial turbine and represents the culmination of more than 15 years of world leading product development in the UK. The 74m long turbine is expected to operate in the waters off Orkney for the next 15-20 years with the capacity to meet the annual electricity demand of around 2,000 UK homes with clean, predictable power from the fast-flowing waters while offsetting approximately 2,200 tonnes of CO2 production per year. In a further ground-breaking element of the project, the O2 will provide power to the European Marine Energy Centre’s onshore electrolyser to generate green hydrogen that will be used to demonstrate decarbonisation of wider energy requirements.

, it is the most powerful tidal turbine in the world and is anchored in the Fall of Warness off Eday, Orkney Islands.

History 
Orbital was the first company in the world to successfully grid connect a floating tidal turbine in 2011. In 2016 the company launched the SR2000, the world’s most powerful tidal stream turbine. The SR2000 produced in excess of 3GWh of electricity over its initial 12-month continuous test programme. At the time this represented more power from a single turbine than had been generated cumulatively by the wave and tidal sector in Scotland over the 12 years prior to the launch of the SR2000.

Orbital O2 was constructed in Dundee, Scotland by Texo Group and launched from the city in April 2021.

Features 

 The O2 incorporates key innovations and lessons from the company's previous prototype, the SR2000, that, on a like-for-like basis, enable a 35% improvement in yield.
 Rotor diameters of 20m.
 600sq metre rotor area, the largest ever on a single tidal generating platform to date.
 360 degree blade pitching control, for safe, dynamic control of the O2’s rotors, enabling power to be captured from both tidal directions without need to yaw the entire platform.
 The floating structure is held on station with a four-point mooring system where each mooring chain has the capacity to lift over 50 double decker     buses. Electricity is transferred from the turbine via a dynamic cable to the seabed and a static cable along the seabed to the local onshore electricity network.

External links

References

Tidal power
Coastal construction
Tides
Renewable energy
Tidal stream generators
Eday